Meron Gribetz is an Israeli technology entrepreneur. He was the founder and CEO of Meta, a Silicon Valley technology company that produced augmented reality products (the company shut down in 2019). He is currently the CEO and founder of Inner Cosmos, makers of a digital pill designed to re-balance brain networks.

Early life and education
Gribetz was born and raised in Israel, where he worked for a number of national start-ups, as well as served in a technological unit in the Israel Defense Forces.

Beginning in 2009, he attended Columbia University in New York, where he studied computer science and neuroscience. He left Columbia shortly before the end of his studies to embark on his tech career. At Columbia, Meron conceived of the idea of a “natural machine” that would replace keyboards, mice, and touchscreens with a more intuitive interface.

Meta
In 2012, while at Columbia University, Meron built a prototype AR headset by hacking a pair of 3D glasses from Epson and fusing them with an Intel-made camera that could track hand movements. In 2013, he founded Meta. The company was accepted into Y-Combinator (YC13). In 2014, Meta produced a see-through pair of glasses that allowed wearers to move and manipulate 3D content and holograms using hand gestures. The project received one million dollars in seed funding and support from Paul Graham and Steve Mann.

In 2018, Meta furloughed most of its one-hundred employees on short notice after it failed to secure another round of venture-capital funding. In 2019, the company declared itself insolvent and sold all its assets in a foreclosure sale.

Inner Cosmos
In 2020, Gribetz launched Inner Cosmos, a technology company. The company's purpose is to develop a minimally invasive brain–computer interface that, implanted in the brain, will treat depression and other mood disorders.

TED2016
In 2016, Meron Gribetz introduced the Meta 2 at TED conference (TED). The Meta 2 consisted of an augmented reality headset that made it possible for users to see, grab, interact with, and move holograms in a natural fashion. At TED, Gribetz suggested this new technology was designed to allow users to interact with virtual objects yet maintain their sense of presence and interaction with their natural surroundings rather than being focused or distracted by traditional 2D computer screens.

Awards
"30 Under 30 Awards" in the Technology category by Forbes. 
 The best heads-up display award for the Meta Pro at the Consumer Electronics Show. 
 Wired’s list of “25 Geniuses Who Are Creating the Future of Business.”
 "Innovators Under 35" (Honoree of MIT Technology Review, 2016)

See also
Rony Abovitz, founder of Magic Leap
 Optical head-mounted display

References

External links 
 Inner Cosmos website
 

21st-century American businesspeople
Living people
Year of birth missing (living people)
Place of birth missing (living people)
Columbia University alumni
Israeli chief executives